Val-de-Chalvagne (literally Vale of Chalvagne) is a commune in the Alpes-de-Haute-Provence department in southeastern France. It was established in 1974 by the merger of the former communes Castellet-Saint-Cassien, Montblanc and Villevieille.

Population
The population data given in the table and graph below for 1968 and earlier refer to the former commune of Castellet-Saint-Cassien.

See also
Communes of the Alpes-de-Haute-Provence department

References

Communes of Alpes-de-Haute-Provence
Alpes-de-Haute-Provence communes articles needing translation from French Wikipedia
States and territories established in 1974